Blinkist is a book-summarizing subscription service based in Berlin, Germany. It was founded in 2012 by Holger Seim, Niklas Jansen, Sebastian Klein, and Tobias Balling and has eighteen million users as of 2021.

The service provides summaries of over 5,000 bestselling nonfiction books in fifteen-minute reads, otherwise known as Blinks, or book-in-blinks. The summaries are available in English and German.

Features 
Users can browse books within 27 categories which include Entrepreneurship & Small Business, Politics, Marketing & Sales, Science, Economics, History, Communication Skills, Corporate Culture and more. The free app lets the user read a random daily pick. Blinkist provides summaries of books and also provides audio versions of the summaries. The service allows users to sync highlights the book summaries to other services like Kindle and Evernote.

Similar services
Blinkist's competitors include Sumizeit, BUUK App, Booknotes, Snapreads, ReadingIQ, getAbstract, Instaread, BookRags, and Quiddity.

See also
 CliffsNotes
 Chegg
 SparkNotes
 Course Hero
 60second Recap
 eNotes

References

External links

Companies based in Berlin
Internet properties established in 2012
German companies established in 2012
German brands
Audiobook companies and organizations
Online companies of Germany
Subscription services